Odostomia aartseni is a species of sea snail, a marine gastropod mollusc in the family Pyramidellidae, the pyrams and their allies.

Distribution
This species occurs in the following locations:
 European waters (ERMS scope) : Mediterranean Sea.

References

 Nofroni I., 1988, Two new Odostomia from the Mediterranean, La Conchiglia 20 (234-235): 10-11, 15

External links
 To CLEMAM
 To Encyclopedia of Life
 To World Register of Marine Species

aartseni
Gastropods described in 1988